Arogyavaram is a Medical centre and locality in Madanapalle in the district of Annamayya district, Andhra Pradesh, India.

Climate

Health
The town is known for its sanatorium (now a general hospital), established in 1912, for the treatment of tuberculosis.

References

External links
 Arogyavaram Medical Centre

Villages in Annamayya district